The 1979 European Amateur Team Championship took place 27 June – 1 July at Esbjerg Golf Club, Esbjerg, Denmark. It was the 11th men's golf European Amateur Team Championship.

Venue 
The tournament was played at the club's Marbæk Course, 15 kilometres north of Esbjerg, Denmark, built in 1975. There were hard winds blowing during the whole tournament on the par 71 course, not far from the North Sea.

Format 
Each team consisted of 6 players, playing two rounds of stroke-play over two days, counting the five best scores each day for each team.

The eight best teams formed flight A, in knock-out match-play over the next three days. The teams were seeded based on their positions after the stroke play. The first placed team were drawn to play the quarter final against the eight placed team, the second against the seventh, the third against the sixth and the fourth against the fifth. Teams were allowed to use six players during the team matches, selecting four of them in the two morning foursome games and five players in to the afternoon single games. Games all square at the 18th hole were declared halved, if the team match was already decided.

The eight teams placed 9–16 in the qualification stroke-play formed flight B to play similar knock-out play and the three teams placed 17–19 formed flight C to meet each other, to decide their final positions.

Teams 
19 nation teams contested the event. Each team consisted of six players.

Winners 
Team England won the gold medal, earning their fifth title, beating Wales in the final 5.5–1.5. Team Ireland earned the bronze on third place, after beating host nation Denmark 5.5–1.5 in the bronze match.

There was no official award for the lowest individual score in the opening 36-hole stroke-play qualifying competition, but individual leader was Paul Downes, England, with a score of 5-over-par 147, three strokes ahead of nearest competitors, his two teammates Peter McEvoy and Michael Kelley.

Björn Svedin, Sweden, shot a new course record 72 over 18 holes on the first day of competition. The course record was equaled by Michael Kelley, England, in the second round the next day, also scoring 72.

Results 
Qualification round

Team standings

* Note: In the event of a tie the order was determined by the best total of the two non-counting scores of the two rounds.

Individual leaders

 Note: There was no official award for the lowest individual score.

Flight A

Bracket

Final games

* Note: Games declared halved, since team match already decided.

Flight B

Bracket

Flight C

Final standings

Sources:

See also 
 Eisenhower Trophy – biennial world amateur team golf championship for men organized by the International Golf Federation.
 European Ladies' Team Championship – European amateur team golf championship for women organised by the European Golf Association.

References

External links 
 European Golf Association: Full results

European Amateur Team Championship
Golf tournaments in the Netherlands
European Amateur Team Championship
European Amateur Team Championship
European Amateur Team Championship
European Amateur Team Championship